Quy Joq or Quyjeq may refer to:
 Quy Joq, Golestan
 Quyjeq, West Azerbaijan